Kornwestheim is a town in the district of Ludwigsburg, Baden-Württemberg, Germany.

History

Origins and Development 
Kornwestheim can look back at a history of more than 1200 years. It was first mentioned in official documents as "Westheim" around 780 AC, within the interest register of the Lorsch monastery. The name form "Kornwestheim" appeared much later; for the first in 1472, which became common in the 17th century and has been in use ever since.

Archeological findings furnish evidence for the populating of the area in already prehistorical times. There was a Roman road that lead through the Kornwestheim urban area, which has been partially preserved as dirt road. Part of it was restored in Kornwestheim-Ost near the Theodor-Heuss-Realschule. In the western part of the city there was an even older road from the Bronze Age running towards what today is a highway.

It is assumed that the original Westheim is a western settlement, in contrast to the eastern settlement of Ostheim. For centuries, Kornwestheim was a prosperous and wealthy farming village that benefited from the fertility of its farmland and active trade. In 1303, the counts of Asperg sold Kornwestheim to the Dukes of Württemberg. At first, it belonged to the bureau of Cannstatt and since 1719 to the bureau of Ludwigsburg out of which emerged the county in 1938 and in 1973 the larger district of Ludwigsburg.

Urbanization in the mid-19th century

With the construction of the railroad line Stuttgart - Ludwigsburg - Heilbronn in 1846 the era of Industrialization began and the construction of the national switch yard in Kornwestheim in the years of 1913-1919 made Kornwestheim the railway road node in Southern Germany, creating ideal conditions for the future growth and development of the city. This infrastructure improvements and the convenient location of the city as well as several factory foundations contributed to a large increase in population in the late 19th century. The shoemaker Jakob Sigle, who had already opened his workshop in 1885, founded the shoe factory J. Sigle & Cie. together with his merchant partner Max Levi, which later became nationally known as the Salamander AG. In 1898, the machine factory A. Stotz Albert Stotz followed as well as the iron foundry firm Kreidler, opening operations in 1939. 
As of April 1, when the population had nearly within the last three decades, Kornwestheim eventually received the official municipal law in 1931.

As part of the rearmament of the German re-armament, starting in 1934 the Hindenburg barracks and the Ludendorff barracks were built as tank units and Kornwestheim became a garrison town in 1935/36. The Second World War demanded numerous victims: allied air raids killed 162 people and destroyed 160 buildings. At the military front 478 resident soldiers were killed. On April 21 in 1945, the US troops took over the occupation using the existing barracks until 1993 and renamed the Hindenburg barracks into Wilkin Barracks. Since the Second World War the population has doubled due to the influx of exiles and guest workers. This resulted in an increased growth and designation of new living and commercial districts. On April 1, 1956, Kornwestheim became a large district town. Due to its location between the cities of Stuttgart and Ludwigsburg, the city was unable to incorporate neighboring communities during the 1973 regional reform. Only the restructuring undertaken by the US Army in 1954 added a new district called Pattonville to the city, although the eastern, larger part of Pattonville now belongs to the town of Remseck am Neckar.

Today 

Today Kornwestheim presents itself as modern and amiable town that has preserved its individual character in the heart of the Stuttgart region. With its more than 30,000 inhabitants it offers a high degree of quality of life and recreational value.

Mayor
At the head of the municipality Kornwestheim was a Schultheiß. Since 1930 he is called mayor and since 1956 Lord mayor.
 1793-1814: Johann Georg Sigle
 1815-1823: Jakob Friedrich Sigle
 1823-1840: Jakob Friedrich Ergenzinger
 1841-1855: Christoph Richt
 1855-1877: Thomas Hofmann
 1877-1887: Georg Mayer
 1887-1892: Karl Sigle
 1892-1902: Adolf Voelmle
 1902-1930: Friedrich Siller
 1930-1931: Theodor Steimle
 1931-1933: Friedrich Siller, temporary administrator
 1933-1945: Alfred Kercher, 1933 initially as temporary administrator
 1945: Gotthilf Küntzle, 
 1945-1948: Friedrich Warthmann, 1945-1946 
 1948-1954: Nathanael Schulz
 1954-1962: Alfred Kercher
 1962-1982: Siegfried Pflugfeld
 1982-1999: Ernst Fischer
 1999-2007: Ulrich Rommelfanger
 Since 2007: Ursula Keck (re-elected on 21 June 2015, 54.44% of the vote)

Transport
At the western edge of Kornwestheim is the Kornwestheim classification yard. Up to 1600 freight cars are daily put together to  freight trains. This is the second largest classification yard of Baden-Württemberg.

Media
As newspaper appears in Kornwestheim the Kornwestheimer Zeitung.

Local Authorities and Councils
Kornwestheim has a notary.
In the city is the Landesamt für Flurneuordnung und Landesentwicklung Baden-Württemberg. On the former Salamander area is since March 21, 2012, the Baden-Württemberg Grundbuchzentralarchiv.

Entertainment
The Kornwestheim Drive-In Cinema is the only drive-in cinema in Baden-Wuerttemberg. It lies in the town of the same name in the Ludwigsburg district and is well known outside the region. For sound, the Kornwestheim Drive-In Cinema has two FM-transmitters which work on 89 MHz for the sound of the film shown on the big projection wall, and on 91.3 MHz for the sound of the film shown on the small projection wall. The light intensity of the projectors used is 6 Kilowatts.

Local Companies
 Kreidler Werke GmbH
The well known small motorcycle and moped manufacturer Kreidler was situated here. It was founded in 1903 by Anton Kreidler and was at first a metalworking factory. Later in the 1950s they started producing small motorcycles with an engine capacity of 50 cc. In the later 1970s they became successful in Grand Prix motorcycle racing. Riders such as Jan de Vries and Henk van Kessel won world championships and set speed records with these machines.

Twin towns – sister cities

Kornwestheim is twinned with:
 Eastleigh, England, United Kingdom
 Kimry, Russia
 Villeneuve-Saint-Georges, France
 Weißenfels, Germany

Notable people
Jakob Vogel (born 1584), physician and writer
Jakob Sigle (1861–1935), founder of the shoe factory Salamander AG
Walter Maier-Kößler (1914–1994), painter
Günther C. Kirchberger (1928–2010), painter
Georg Utz (born 1935), wrestler
Roland Geiger (born 1941), screen printers, publishers and art gallery owner
Anneke Dürkopp (born 1979), presenter

Honorary citizens
The town Kornwestheim has conferred to the following persons the honorary citizenship:
1896: Hugo von Baur, Colonel and commander of the Landwehr District Ludwigsburg
1916: Jakob Sigle, Privy Councillor of Commerce, Founder of Salamander AG
1916: Max Levi, Consul, co-founder of Salamander AG
1927: Ernst Sigle, Honorary Chairman of Salamander AG
1927: Isidor Rothschild (1860–1929), the Management and Supervisory Board of Salamander AG
1930: Friedrich Siller, Schultheiss
1950: Karl Joos, founder of the District Cooperative Altwürttemberg
1963: Alfred Kercher, Mayor retired
1970: Marius Faisse, mayor of the twin town Villeneuve-Saint-Georges
1989: Siegfried Pflugfelder, Mayor ret.
2004: Ernst Fischer, Mayor ret.
2011: Siegbert Hörer, local politician

References 
 Citations

Towns in Baden-Württemberg
Ludwigsburg (district)
Württemberg